Anne Patricia Manning (born 13 November 1959 in Brisbane, Queensland) is a retired racewalker from Australia. She set her personal best in the women's  race walk event (44:27) in 1996.

Achievements

References

1959 births
Living people
Australian female racewalkers
Athletes (track and field) at the 1994 Commonwealth Games
Athletes (track and field) at the 1996 Summer Olympics
Olympic athletes of Australia
Commonwealth Games silver medallists for Australia
Athletes from Brisbane
American sportswomen
Commonwealth Games medallists in athletics
21st-century Australian women
20th-century Australian women
Medallists at the 1994 Commonwealth Games